Jules Cowles (October 18, 1877 – May 22, 1943) was an American film actor. He was also billed as J. D. Cowles and Julius D. Cowles.

Born in Farmington, Connecticut, Cowles attended Yale and was a writer in addition to being an actor. Before he began acting in films, he performed in a Shakespearean repertory company with Augustin Daly for five years.

Cowles died on May 22, 1943, in Hollywood, California, aged 65.

Selected filmography

 A Royal Family (1915)
 Notorious Gallagher (1916)
 The Bar Sinister (1917)
 The Service Star (1918)
 To the Highest Bidder (1919)
 The Poor Rich Man (1918)
 The Cambric Mask (1919)
 A Fool and His Money (1920)
 Tangled Trails (1921)
 The Idol of the North (1921)
 The Bootleggers (1922)
 The Ne'er-Do-Well (1923)
 Lost in a Big City (1923)
 The Love Bandit (1924)
 High Speed (1924)
 The Lost World (1925)
 Seven Chances (1925)
 Sweet Marie (1925)
 Spook Ranch (1925)
 Lord Jim (1925)
 Money to Burn (1926)
 The Scarlet Letter (1926)
 The Road to Romance (1927)
 Mockery (1927)
 London After Midnight (1927)
 Sal of Singapore (1928)
 Dog Law (1928)
 Isle of Lost Men (1928)
 Why Sailors Go Wrong (1928)
 Terror Mountain (1928)
 Thundergod (1928)
 Bringing Up Father (1928)
 The Leatherneck (1929)
 His First Command (1929)
 One Hysterical Night (1929)
 Sea Devils (1931)
 Heaven on Earth (1931)
 Secret Menace (1931)
 Renegades of the West (1932)
 The Fighting Parson (1933)
 The Scarlet Letter (1934)
 The Pursuit of Happiness (1934)
 Law Beyond the Range (1935)

References

Bibliography
 Munden, Kenneth White. The American Film Institute Catalog of Motion Pictures Produced in the United States, Part 1. University of California Press, 1997.

External links

1877 births
1943 deaths
American male film actors
People from Connecticut